The Papua New Guinea Rugby Football Union, or Rugby PNG is the governing body for rugby union in Papua New Guinea. It was established in 1962 and was affiliated to the International Rugby Board in 1993.

Rugby PNG is a full member of the Federation of Oceania Rugby Unions (FORU), which is the regional governing body for rugby in Oceania.

National teams

Papua New Guinea's national team, the Pukpuks, has not yet competed in a Rugby World Cup, but has won the FORU Oceania Cup Championship four times (as of November 2015). PNG fields teams in 7s competitions as well as 15s. The national women's 7s team was established in 2007, and won the Asia Pacific Women's Sevens Championships in 2011.

See also

 Papua New Guinea national rugby union team
 Papua New Guinea national rugby sevens team
 Papua New Guinea national under-20 rugby union team
 Papua New Guinea women's national rugby union team
 Papua New Guinea women's national rugby sevens team
 Rugby union in Papua New Guinea

External links
 Papua New Guinea Rugby Football Union on facebook.com
 Papua New Guinea on IRB.com
 Papua New Guinea on OceaniaRugby.com

Reference list

Rugby union in Papua New Guinea
Sports organisations of Papua New Guinea
Rugby union governing bodies in Oceania
Sports organizations established in 1962